Cathcart is a Surname of Scottish origin. Notable people with the surname include:

Anna Cathcart (born 2003), Canadian actress
Charles W. Cathcart (1809–1888), US Senator
Craig Cathcart (born 1989), Northern Irish footballer
Edward Provan Cathcart (1877–1954), physiologist
Fanny Cathcart (1833–1880), Australian actress
George Cathcart (1794–1854), British soldier and diplomat
James Cathcart (disambiguation) several people:
 James Carter Cathcart, American voice actor
 James Faucett Cathcart (1827–1902), English actor in Australia
 James Leander Cathcart (1767–1843), diplomat, slave, and sailor

See also
Earl of Cathcart

Surnames of Scottish origin
English-language surnames